CAW  may refer to:
 Canadian Auto Workers, a Canadian large and high profile social union
 Carbon arc welding, a process which produces coalescence of metals by heating them with an arc between a nonconsumable carbon electrode and the work-piece
 Center for Asymmetric Warfare, a U.S. Navy entity dedicated to supporting American military forces
 Church of All Worlds, an American neopagan religious group
 Community Archives Wales, a website of digital content

Caw may refer to :
 Caw (bull), a legendary bull in Meitei mythology of Manipur
 a robot Doctor Who henchman
 Kallawaya language ISO 639-2 code
Caw (hill), a hill in the south of the English Lake District, England 
Caw, County Londonderry, a townland in County Londonderry, Northern Ireland

See also
 Caw Fell, a fell in the west of the English Lake District
 Hueil mab Caw, a Pictish warrior and traditional rival of King Arthur's
 CAWS (disambiguation)